Appliance may refer to:

Electrical equipment and machinery
 Computer appliance, a computing device with a specific function and limited configuration ability, e.g.:
Storage appliance, provides storage functionality for multiple attached systems using the transparent local storage area networks paradigm
Anti-spam appliances, detect and eliminate e-mail spam
Firewall (computing), a computer appliance designed to protect computer networks from unwanted traffic
Network appliance, a general purpose router (computing)
Security appliance, a computer appliance designed to protect computer networks from unwanted traffic
Software appliance, a software application that might be combined with just enough operating system (JeOS) for it to run optimally on industry standard hardware
Virtual appliance, a pre-configured virtual machine image, ready to run on a hypervisor
 Home appliance, a household machine that uses electricity or some other energy input which includes MVHR units
 Small appliance, also called a small domestic appliance or small electric, a portable or semi-portable machine, generally used on a table top, counter top, or other platform, to accomplish a household task 
 Major appliance, or domestic appliance, a large machine used for routine a housekeeping task

Arts, entertainment, and media
 Appliance (band), a British musical group
 Appliance, a motion pictures industry term for a latex piece, such as false ears or other features, used by make-up artists

Fire safety
 Fire alarm notification appliance, an active fire protection component of a fire alarm system
 Fire apparatus, a fire engine or fire truck in British English

Healthcare
 Appliance, in medicine and dentistry, a device custom-fitted to an individual for the purpose of correction of a physical or dental problem, e.g.:
 Dental braces
 Orthotics, an orthotic appliance
 Prosthesis